(or, under its original name in 1829, Elisabetta al castello di Kenilworth) is a melodramma serio or tragic opera in three acts by Gaetano Donizetti. Andrea Leone Tottola wrote the Italian libretto after Victor Hugo's play  (1828) and Eugène Scribe's play Leicester, both of which following from Sir Walter Scott's novel Kenilworth (1821). Daniel Auber composed another opera on the same subject, Leicester, ou Le chateau de Kenilworth in 1823.

This opera was the first of Donizetti's excursions into the Tudor period of English history, and it was followed in 1830 by Anna Bolena, (which was based on the life of Anne Boleyn, the second wife of King Henry VIII), then by Maria Stuarda (named for Mary, Queen of Scots) which appeared in different forms in 1834 and 1835. All represented the interests (even obsessions) of many Italian composers of the era, Donizetti's included, in the character of Elizabeth I, whose life he was to explore further in 1837 in his opera Roberto Devereux (named for a putative lover of Elizabeth I.) The leading female characters of the operas Anna Bolena, Maria Stuarda, and Roberto Devereux are often referred to as the "Three Donizetti Queens".

As Elisabetta al castello di Kenilworth the opera received its first performance on 6 July 1829 at the Teatro di San Carlo, Naples, and in a revised version at the same house, as Il castello di Kenilworth on 24 June 1830.

Roles

Synopsis 
Time: The reign of Queen Elizabeth I
Place: Kenilworth Castle

It is announced that Queen Elizabeth is to visit Kenilworth, the Earl of Leicester's castle. Leicester is a favourite of the Queen, but now has a new bride, Amelia Robsart, with whom he is in love. Fearing the Queen's displeasure, he asks his servant Lambourne to arrange for Amelia to be hidden until Elizabeth departs. Amelia is taken to a small cell in the castle by Leicester's equerry, Warney. He then tries to seduce her and tells that she has been placed there because her husband no longer loves her. When Amelia rejects his advances, Warney vows revenge.

Amelia manages to escape from the cell and in a secret garden of the castle encounters the Queen. She tearfully tells the Queen about her troubles with Leicester, whom she believes has betrayed her. The Queen goes to Leicester and Warney angrily demanding an explanation. Warney deceitfully tries to persuade the Queen that Amelia is his wife. The Queen vows to resolve the mystery and briefly believes the lie. Leicester, however, reveals his marriage with Amelia to the Queen who becomes even more angry and dismisses him.

Warney, still desiring revenge, attempts to take Amelia away with him from Kenilworth with a lie that it is Leicester's wish, but fails when she refuses to go. He then tries to poison Amelia, but is foiled by her faithful servant, Fanny. In the end, Elizabeth orders the arrest of Warney, pardons Leicester and Amelia, and approves their marriage to the jubilation of all.

Recordings

References
Notes

Cited sources
Ashbrook, William and Sarah Hibberd (2001), in Holden, Amanda (Ed.), The New Penguin Opera Guide, New York: Penguin Putnam. . pp. 224–247.
Gelli, Piero (ed.) (2007), "Elisabetta al castello di Kenilworth", Dizionario dell'Opera, Baldini Castoldi Dalai. . Accessed online 22 September 2009.

Other sources
Allitt, John Stewart (1991), Donizetti: In the Light of Romanticism and the Teaching of Johann Simon Mayr, Shaftesbury: Element Books; Rockport, Massachusetts: Element, Inc.  
Ashbrook, William (1982), Donizetti and His Operas, Cambridge University Press. 
Ashbrook, William (1998), "Elisabetta al castello di Kenilworth (1829)", Opera Quarterly, 1998; 14, pp. 116–119.
Ashbrook, William (1998), "Donizetti, Gaetano" in Stanley Sadie (Ed.), The New Grove Dictionary of Opera, Vol. One. London: Macmillan Publishers, Inc.  
Black, John (1982), Donizetti’s Operas in Naples, 1822—1848. London: The Donizetti Society.
Loewenberg, Alfred (1970). Annals of Opera, 1597–1940, 2nd edition. Rowman and Littlefield
Osborne, Charles, (1994), The Bel Canto Operas of Rossini, Donizetti, and Bellini, Portland, Oregon: Amadeus Press. 
Sadie, Stanley, (ed.); John Tyrell (exec. ed.) (2004), The New Grove Dictionary of Music and Musicians. 2nd edition. London: Macmillan.  (hardcover).   (eBook).
 Weinstock, Herbert (1963), Donizetti and the World of Opera in Italy, Paris, and Vienna in the First Half of the Nineteenth Century, New York: Pantheon Books.

External links
 

Operas by Gaetano Donizetti
Italian-language operas
Operas
1829 operas
Operas set in England
Operas about Elizabeth I
Opera world premieres at the Teatro San Carlo
Operas based on plays
Operas based on novels
Operas based on works by Eugène Scribe
Operas based on works by Victor Hugo
Operas based on works by Walter Scott
Libretti by Andrea Leone Tottola